Frederik Adeler may refer to:

Frederik Adeler (1700–1766), Danish government official and governor
Frederik Georg Adeler (1736–1810), Dano-Norwegian county official and landowner 
Frederik Adeler (1764–1816), Dano-Norwegian noble and government official